Deion Mikesell (born 7 January 1997) is an American professional rugby union player. He played as a winger for the Houston Sabercats in Major League Rugby (MLR).

He previously signed with Clermont Auvergne on a developmental contract and also represented America with the United States national rugby union team internationally.

References

1997 births
Living people
American rugby union players
Rugby union wings
Lindenwood University alumni
Houston SaberCats players
United States international rugby union players
US Carcassonne players